
Gmina Stanisławów is a rural gmina (administrative district) in Mińsk County, Masovian Voivodeship, in east-central Poland.

Villages
Gmina Stanisławów contains the villages and settlements of Borek Czarniński, Choiny, Ciopan, Cisówka, Czarna, Goździówka, Kolonie Stanisławów, Ładzyń, Legacz, Łęka, Lubomin, Mały Stanisławów, Ołdakowizna, Papiernia, Porąb, Prądzewo, Pustelnik, Retków, Rządza, Sokóle, Stanisławów, Suchowizna, Szymankowszczyzna, Wólka Czarnińska, Wólka Piecząca, Wólka Wybraniecka, Wólka-Konstancja, Zalesie and Zawiesiuchy.

Neighbouring gminas
Gmina Stanisławów is bordered by the town of Zielonka and by the gminas of Dębe Wielkie, Dobre, Jakubów, Mińsk Mazowiecki, Poświętne and Strachówka.

References

Polish official population figures 2006

Stanislawow
Mińsk County